Tomoxia binotata is a species of beetle in the genus Tomoxia of the family Mordellidae. It was described by Ray in 1939.

References

Beetles described in 1939
Tomoxia